Simon Davies may refer to:

Simon Davies (privacy advocate), British advocate
Simon Davies (footballer, born 1974), Welsh international footballer (born in England), former Chester City F.C. manager
Simon Davies (footballer, born 1979), Welsh international footballer (born in Haverfordwest), whose clubs have included Tottenham Hotspur and Fulham
Simon Davies (English TV presenter) (born 1963), English designer, interior decorator and television presenter working in Sweden
Simon Davies (Welsh TV presenter) (born 1959), Welsh television presenter and former actor
Simon Davies (solicitor) (born 1967), British lawyer

See also
Simon Davis (disambiguation)